The Avanti (including the Avanti II) is an American performance sports coupe based on the Studebaker Avanti and marketed through a succession of five different ownership arrangements between 1965 and 2006.  

Subsequent to Studebaker's December 20, 1963, closure of its South Bend factory and effective discontinuation of the auto with the 1964 model year, cars carrying the Avanti nameplate were initially produced from left-over Studebaker components, and later by the Avanti Motor Company from General Motors and Ford chassis and engines.  A small and often interrupted stream of increasingly modified cars were made before all production ceased in 2006.

Avanti II

Altman and Newman

After Studebaker ended production at South Bend on December 20, 1963, the "Avanti" model name, tooling, Studebaker truck production rights and parts and plant space were bought by local Studebaker dealers, Nate and Arnold Altman and Leo Newman, who incorporated as Avanti Motor Corporation and hand-built a small number of cars. Leo Newman ran the Studebaker truck parts division which enabled the company to be profitable at its outset. According to Stu Chapman, Studebaker Director of Advertising & Public Relations 1964–1966, in his book 'My Father The Car: Memoirs Of My Life With Studebaker', there was talk with Studebaker of reintroducing the Avanti to Studebaker showrooms in 1965/66, along with ambitious plans for rebadging an Isuzu Bellett as an entry level Studebaker, and combining with Canadian Motor Industries.

The Altman brothers introduced a slightly modified version of the car in 1965 under the brand name "Avanti II". which initially had a  Chevrolet Corvette engine. This evolved to the 400, then the small-block 350, and then the 305 for 1981. The  V8 had electronic engine controls, and GM's Turbo 350 automatic transmission with lock-up. Building one of the 1980s Avanti IIs required 10 to 12 weeks, depending on special color or upholstery orders. The last Avanti II made came off the line with a V6 engine from Roush and only one was made. After Nate Altman's death, Arnold Altman ran the company until it was sold in 1982. From 1963 to 1985, Avanti IIs were built on the Studebaker-designed chassis, then the Chevrolet Monte Carlo chassis was used; Chevy discontinued the Monte Carlo in 1987, and Avanti switched to the Chevrolet Caprice chassis.

Stephen Blake
On October 1, 1982, real-estate developer Stephen H. Blake bought the rights to the Avanti II. The state of Indiana guaranteed $1.9 million in loans to Avanti, as part of the financial package offered Blake when he bought the company.

Modifications were introduced to the car, which had remained unchanged since the production of the Avanti II model began in the mid-1960s. A new convertible body style along with an all-new and lighter backbone chassis that was designed by Herb Adams, a former Pontiac engineer, using a torque tube with a 1985 Chevrolet Corvette aluminum rear end and independent suspension. Rectangular headlight openings and plastic body-colored bumpers were introduced.  Each of these cars took eight to ten weeks to hand build. 

Blake's company declared bankruptcy and he resigned in February 1986.

Avanti

Michael Kelly

The Avanti Motor Company was purchased by Michael Eugene Kelly.  The "II" was dropped from the car's name and all subsequent cars were called the "Avanti". The company then had second-generation Avanti styling originated by Tom Kellogg, the youngest member of the original Studebaker Avanti design team.

John Cafaro

The company was acquired and run from 1987–1991 by John J. Cafaro. With the financial assistance of the State of Ohio, he moved all Avanti production from South Bend – its birthplace – to Youngstown, Ohio. In 1988 and 1989 Avanti made two-door coupes and a convertible. The 1988 Avanti were called the "Silver Year" models, marking 25 years since the Avanti's introduction.

In 1989, Cafaro lost faith in the original coupe and introduced a four-door version, of which 90 were built. In four years, only 405 Avantis were made at the Youngstown plant, which closed in 1991.

Kelly repurchase

Kelly repurchased the company in 1999. He moved its operations from Ohio to Georgia and produced redesigned Avanti automobiles in Villa Rica from 2000 to 2005. From 2004, Ford Mustang chassis and engines were used. In October 2005 an internet report said "Avanti Motors [had] recently announced a new relationship with Ford Motor Company and was planning a big comeback".

In early 2006, Kelly moved Avanti production to a new plant in Cancun, Mexico, but the company floundered after Kelly's arrest on fraud charges in December 2006, over a large Ponzi scheme he was running.
 The last Avanti rolled off the line in Cancun, Mexico in March  2006. All the Mustang-based Avantis used V8 engines, with the option of a Ford V6. Only one 2006 Avanti was built with a Ford V6 engine. The factory and showroom were emptied in 2011 and have been sold. Many extremely rare Studebaker and Avanti concepts and racing vehicles that were on the second floor of the building in Cancun have been moved elsewhere and/or sold.

References

Further reading
 Hull, John. Avanti: The Complete Story, United States: Enthusiast Books (2008).

External links

 Avanti Owners Association International homepage Association for owners of both Studebaker and non-Studebaker Avanti cars
 Avanti Motors homepage Link to last known Avanti Company website with pictures of 2007 models

Coupés
Sedans
Convertibles
1960s cars
1970s cars
1980s cars
1990s cars
2000s cars
Rear-wheel-drive vehicles

Sports cars
Cars of the United States
Sports car manufacturers